Brigadier John Alexander Sinton,  (2 December 1884 – 25 March 1956) was a British medical doctor, malariologist, soldier, and a recipient of the Victoria Cross, the highest award for gallantry in the face of the enemy that can be awarded to British and Commonwealth forces.

Early life
Sinton was born in Victoria, British Columbia, the third of the seven children of Walter Lyon Sinton (1860–1930) and his wife, Isabella Mary, née Pringle (1860–1924), a family of Quaker linen manufacturers from north of Ireland. On his mother's side he was a cousin of James Pringle, and a nephew of Thomas Sinton and cousin of Ernest Walton on his father's. In 1890 they returned to Ulster where he was educated and lived for the rest of his life. He studied at the Royal Belfast Academical Institution and read medicine at the Queen's University, Belfast, where he graduated in 1908 as first in his year. He went on to attain degrees from the University of Cambridge (1910) and the University of Liverpool (1911).

Sinton joined the Indian Medical Service in 1911, coming first in the entrance examinations, but before being posted to India was seconded as the Queen's University research scholar to the Liverpool School of Tropical Medicine where his contact with Sir Ronald Ross may have influenced his later career as a malariologist.

Military career
Sinton was 31 years old and a captain in the Indian Medical Service (IMS), Indian Army, during the First World War.  On 21 January 1916 at the Orah Ruins, Mesopotamia, Captain Sinton attended to the wounded under very heavy fire and the citation to his VC reads:

Sinton later achieved the rank of brigadier (1943), was awarded the Russian Order of St George and mentioned in dispatches six times.

In 1921 he transferred from the military to the civil branch of the IMS which he continued to serve with until 1936.

Medical career
In July 1921 he was put in charge of the quinine and malaria inquiry under the newly formed Central Malaria Bureau. He was appointed the first director of the malaria survey of India at Kasauli in 1925 where he worked with Sir S. R. Christophers.

He became Manson fellow at the London School of Hygiene and Tropical Medicine and at the malaria laboratory of the Ministry of Health at Horton Hospital, near Epsom. He also became adviser on malaria to the Ministry of Health. With the outbreak of the Second World War, Sinton was recalled as an IMS reservist and commanded a hospital in India. At the age of fifty-five he was again retired, but was appointed consultant malariologist to the east African force and later to Middle East command, retiring with the honorary rank of brigadier in August 1943.

He then worked as consultant malariologist to the War Office, travelling widely to Assam, Australia, Burma, Ceylon, India, New Guinea, and the Solomon Islands, where his expertise in malaria was invaluable. Further military decorations resulted from this period, after which Sinton returned to Northern Ireland and retired to Cookstown. He was elected Fellow of the Royal Society in 1946.

Other activities
Sinton is the only Fellow of the Royal Society to have received a Victoria Cross. In his retirement he served as Deputy Lieutenant for County Tyrone and, in 1953, as High Sheriff of Tyrone.

At Kasauli, Sinton met Eadith Seymour Steuart-Martin (1894–1977), daughter of Edwin Steuart-Martin and Ada May Martin (née Martin), whom he married on 19 September 1923. Their daughter, Eleanor Isabel Mary Sinton, was born at Kasauli on 9 December 1924.

His name is remembered in Sinton Halls, a student housing block at the Queen's University, Belfast, where he sat on the senate and was a Pro-Chancellor. The Sinton Medical and Dental Centre at Thiepval Barracks, Lisburn is also named in his honour.   Others honoured Sinton by naming three mosquito species, Aedes sintoni, Anopheles sintoni, and Anopheles sintonoides, one sandfly species, Sergentomyia sintoni, and one subgenus Sintonius of the genus Phlebotomus, after him.

He died at his home at Slaghtfreedan Lodge, Cookstown, County Tyrone, on 25 March 1956 and was buried with full military honours on 28 March at Claggan Presbyterian cemetery in Cookstown.  Colonel H. W. Mulligan in an obituary in the British Medical Journal described him thus:

His Victoria Cross is displayed at the Army Medical Services Museum at Aldershot.

References

External links

Location of grave in Co. Tyrone
Brigadier J.A. Sinton
Genealogy of Jack Sinton
 

1884 births
1956 deaths
British Indian Army officers
20th-century Anglo-Irish people
Deputy Lieutenants of Tyrone
People educated at the Royal Belfast Academical Institution
People from Victoria, British Columbia
Alumni of Queen's University Belfast
Alumni of the University of Liverpool
Indian Army personnel of World War I
Fellows of the Royal Society
Indian Army personnel of World War II
British entomologists
Malariologists
British World War I recipients of the Victoria Cross
Indian Medical Service officers
High Sheriffs of Tyrone
Manson medal winners
British tropical physicians
20th-century British zoologists